Jeremy Senglin (born March 24, 1995) is an American professional basketball player for Pallacanestro Reggiana of the Lega Basket Serie A. He played college basketball for Weber State University.

College career
Senglin came to Weber State from James Bowie High School in Arlington, Texas. He was named first-team All-Big Sky Conference as a junior and senior. On March 10, 2017 Senglin became the second player in school history, and the fourth in conference history, to eclipse the 2,000 career point mark. He finished as Weber State's all-time leading scorer at the time he graduated. He also left as Weber State's and the Big Sky's career leader in 3-pointers made with 345. Set a school and Big Sky single-season record by making 132 3-pointers during his senior year, the most 3-pointers of any player in the country. He finished second in the nation in 3-pointers per game at 3.9, and was sixth in the country in 3-point percentage at 44.7 percent. Led the Wildcats in points, field goals made, 3-pointers made, free throws made, minutes played, assists, and steals. He was twice a part of Big Sky regular season and tournament championship teams and twice played in the NCAA Tournament.

College Awards and honors
 2× First-team All-Big Sky Conference (2016, 2017)
 2× Big Sky All-Tournament Team (2016, 2017)
 2nd All-time leading scorer in Wildcat history (2,078 points)
 2nd leading scorer in Big Sky history (2017)
 NABC All-District (6) First Team (2017)
 NABC All-District (6) Second Team (2016)
 Gulf Coast Showcase MVP (2016)
 Gulf Coast Showcase All-Tournament Team (2016)
Big Sky tournament MVP (2016)
 Big Sky Freshman of the Year (2014)

Professional career
Following the close of his college career, Senglin played in the Portsmouth Invitational Tournament. After a strong showing there, he was invited to join the Brooklyn Nets' Summer League team. On August 4, he signed with the Nets to a training camp deal. On October 11 he was waived by Brooklyn. Senglin then signed with Brooklyn's NBA G League team, the Long Island Nets. He played 48 games, averaging 14.5 points and 2.6 assists per game. Senglin set the Long Island franchise single-game scoring record on January 24, 2018 by scoring 40 points against the Maine Red Claws.

On April 7, 2018, Senglin was reported to have signed with MHP Riesen Ludwigsburg of the Basketball Bundesliga.

On June 26, 2019, Senglin signed a contract with MoraBanc Andorra of the Liga ACB. He averaged 7.9 points on 43.6% three-point shooting and 2.4 assists per game. Senglin re-signed with MoraBanc Andorra on July 15, 2020. He averaged 11.3 points, 2.5 rebounds, and 1.8 assists per game.

On July 13, 2021, Senglin signed with Nanterre 92 of the LNB Pro A.

On August 4, 2022, he has signed with Fuenlabrada of the Liga ACB.

References

External links
Weber State Wildcats bio
ESPN Jeremy Senglin Stats, Bio
REAL GM Jeremy Senglin Player Profile
Dakota Schmidt (July 1, 2017). Undrafted Treasures: Jeremy Senglin. https://www.ridiculousupside.com/2017/6/30/15906410/undrafted-treasures-jeremy-senglin-nba-dleague-gleague-weber-state-nbagleague-brooklyn-nets 

1995 births
Living people
American expatriate basketball people in France
American expatriate basketball people in Germany
American expatriate basketball people in Spain
American men's basketball players
Baloncesto Fuenlabrada players
Basketball players from Kansas City, Missouri
Basketball players from Texas
BC Andorra players
Expatriate basketball people in Andorra
American expatriate basketball people in Andorra
Liga ACB players
Long Island Nets players
Nanterre 92 players
Pallacanestro Reggiana players
Point guards
Riesen Ludwigsburg players
Shooting guards
Sportspeople from Arlington, Texas
Weber State Wildcats men's basketball players